Malta Test Station, located in Malta, New York, is a former US Army  fuel and explosives testing facility. It was established in 1945 and used to test rocket engines for the US Army's "Project Hermes", new fuels and explosives. It has also been used for atomic energy research.

Malta test station has been used by various government agencies including the US Department of Defense, National Aeronautics and Space Agency (NASA), the US Department of Energy, and the New York State Energy Research and Development Authority (NYSERDA), it was operated by General Electric until 1972 when the Wright-Malta Corporation took over occupation and  continued to test fuels and explosives for the US military and the US Department of Energy until 2005.

The Wright Malta Corporation also worked on noise suppression systems, fuel cells, assisted technologically oriented start up businesses, waste-to-energy technology, liquid fuel propellants, and a number of other emerging technologies related to defense, energy, and product testing.

The Malta Test Station was the site of a serious industrial accident in May 2004.

The site and surrounding area has since been transformed into the Luther Forest Technology Campus, home to a new chip fabrication plant owned by GlobalFoundries. "Project Hermes" is commemorated by Hermes Road, one of the main access roads to the Technology Campus.

It was listed as a Superfund site in 1987 and removed from the list following cleanup in 1999. It is being monitored by the US Environmental Protection agency to ensure that it is safe from possible chemical contamination.

Gallery

See also
List of Superfund sites in New York

References

Research installations of the United States Army
Weapons test sites
Buildings and structures in Saratoga County, New York
Military Superfund sites
Superfund sites in New York (state)
1945 establishments in New York (state)